The 2019 FC Irtysh Pavlodar season was the 28th successive season that the club will play in the Kazakhstan Premier League, the highest tier of association football in Kazakhstan. After narrowly avoiding relegation the previous season, Irtysh also participate in the Kazakhstan Cup, reaching the Quarterfinal's before defeat to Kaisar, and finishing 8th in the Premier League.

Season events
At the end of April, rumors that manager Dimitar Dimitrov had left his role where downplayed by the club, however Dimitrov and his coaching staff subsequently went AWOL for Irtysh Pavlodar's match against Zhetysu on 1 May. The following day, 2 May, Dimitrov and his staff where summoned by clubs leadership to explain their absence, an explanation that wasn't demean valid by the club but he was suspended over the matter, with Sergey Klimov being appointed as caretaker manager.

On 7 June, Milan Milanović was announced as the club's new manager.

On 21 November, Irtysh signed Miloš Stamenković, Carlos Fonseca, Arman Kenesov, Serikbol Kapanov, Alexander Zarutsky and Dmitry Schmidt to new contracts.

On 29 November, Irtysh announced that Arman Nusip and Rafkat Aslan had signed new contracts with the club.

Squad

Transfers

In

Loans in

Released

Trial

Friendlies

Competitions

Premier League

Results summary

Results by round

Results

League table

Kazakhstan Cup

Squad statistics

Appearances and goals

|-
|colspan="14"|Players away from Irtysh Pavlodar on loan:
|-
|colspan="14"|Players who left Irtysh Pavlodar during the season:

|}

Goal scorers

Disciplinary record

References

External links
Official Website

FC Irtysh Pavlodar seasons
Irtysh Pavlodar